200 Market, also known as the Black Box, is a 19-story high-rise commercial office building in downtown Portland, Oregon, United States. It was completed in 1973 and certified LEED Platinum in 2010. It was the first multi-tenant building in the U.S. to be LEED Gold-certified, in 2006.

Tenants
 Cambia Health Solutions

See also

 Awning (sculpture)
 List of tallest buildings in Portland, Oregon

References

External links
 
 List of tenants

1970s architecture in the United States
1973 establishments in Oregon
Leadership in Energy and Environmental Design gold certified buildings
Office buildings completed in 1973
Skyscraper office buildings in Portland, Oregon
Southwest Portland, Oregon